Esports Stadium Arlington (ESA) is a North American esports facility located in Arlington, Texas. The 100,000 sqft venue is the largest dedicated esports facility in North America and holds 2,500 spectators.

Description 
Esports Stadium Arlington measures  of total space and has the capacity to hold 2,500 seated spectators.

History 
In March 2018, the city of Arlington announced plans to develop the largest esports stadium in the United States that was scheduled to open later that year. The project was collaboration between the city, Esports Venues LLC, which is owned by Texas Rangers co-owner Neil Leibman, Populous, who designed the stadium, and NGAGE Esports.

The venue officially opened on November 26, 2018.

In December 2020, all but two of Esports Stadium Arlington employees were laid off. President Jonathon Oudthone left the company for undisclosed reasons, with Luke Bauer, chairman of the Texas Rangers ownership committee, becoming the new president of the venue.

In January 2022, esports and gaming company Envy Gaming acquired the operating contract for Esports Stadium Arlington from Esports Venues LLC.

Events 
The venue's first hosted event was FACEIT's Esports Championship Series Season Six Finals, a global competition for Counter-Strike: Global Offensive in November 2018. After shutting down operations due in February 2020 to due to the COVID-19 pandemic, ESA hosted its first live event since the pandemic began — a match between the Dallas Fuel and Houston Outlaws of the Overwatch League in July 2021.

References

External links

2018 establishments in Texas
Sports venues in Arlington, Texas
Dallas Fuel
Esports venues in Texas